The Big Maple Leaf (BML) is a $1 million (CAD) gold coin weighing  (3,215 troy ounces). A set of six of these coins was produced by the Royal Canadian Mint (RCM) in 2007, at their Ottawa facility where the first BML produced remains in storage. , the market value of a single Big Maple Leaf had reached approximately $4 million (USD). On 27 March 2017, one of the coins was stolen from a Berlin museum.

The Big Maple Leaf remained the largest gold coin ever minted until 2011, when the 1 tonne Australian Gold Nugget ("Gold Kangaroo") was minted.

Description 
The obverse of the BML shows Queen Elizabeth II as she has appeared on Canadian coinage , when Susanna Blunt's design became the third iteration of the queen's effigy to appear on coinage, (the others were 1965, and 1990). Blunt's design was intended to show the queen 'in maturing dignity', without a tiara or crown, (only one other RCM design ever had the monarch not wearing a crown). The reverse design is the stylized maple leaf by RCM artist and senior engraver: Stan Witten.

Theft of one coin 
In the early hours of 27 March 2017, a Big Maple Leaf was stolen from the Münzkabinett (coin cabinet) of the Bode Museum in Berlin, Germany. The cabinet is known for its huge collection of coins – more than 500,000 pieces, among them more than 100,000 Greek and 50,000 Roman ones – though only a tiny fraction of these coins are shown at exhibits.

A spokesman for the Royal Canadian Mint said "…the stolen coin does not belong to the mint. After creating the original (which is in storage in Ottawa), the mint manufactured five more that were sold to interested private individuals." The coin was lent to the Bode Museum in 2010 by private owner Boris Fuchsmann, and was displayed there until it was stolen.

In July 2017, police raids took place and arrests were made in connection with the theft. The suspects come from a large Arab family notorious for organised crime. Berlin Police assume that the coin was damaged during the theft when it was dropped from the train tracks onto the street. The whereabouts of the gold coin remain unknown. Investigators do not expect to recover the coin as they found gold dust on seized clothing and a car and suspect the robbers may have melted the coin down.

In January 2019, a trial in a juvenile court against four suspects began. The fourth person, Denis W., was a school friend of the Remmo's and an employee of the Bode Museum. Denis was found guilty of advising the others on the museum's safety protocols. The trial ended in February 2020 with Ahmed and Wissam being sentenced to  years and Denis being sentenced to 3 years 4 months, the lenient sentencing being a result of them being relatively young (Ahmed and Wissam having been 18 and 20, respectively) during the crime. The fourth defendant, Wayci Remmo was acquitted due to inconclusive evidence. The judge ordered the seizure of 3.4 million Euros from the defendants.

Fuchsmann's insurance paid only 20% of the coin's value, arguing that negligence by the museum was to blame for the loss. After a lawsuit, the insurance company was ordered to pay 50% of the value.

References 

Bullion coins of Canada
Gold bullion coins